The Duncan Sisters (Rosetta and Vivian Duncan) were an American vaudeville duo who became popular in the 1920s with their act Topsy and Eva.

Biography

Early career

Rosetta (November 23, 1894 – December 4, 1959) and Vivian Duncan (June 17, 1897 – September 19, 1986) were born in Los Angeles, California, the daughters of a violinist turned salesman.  They began their stage careers in 1911 as part of the cast of Gus Edwards' Kiddies' Revue.

During the next few years they perfected their act with Rosetta as a foghorn-voiced comedian and Vivian as the pretty-but-dumb blonde type.  Within a few years they "matured into first-rate vaudeville troupers who wrote much of their music in dialogue." They subsequently played not only in vaudeville, but also in night clubs and on stage in both New York and London.   They made their first important Broadway appearance in 1917 at the Winter Garden Theatre in a show with Ed Wynn and Frank Tinney entitled Doing Our Bit.

In 1923 the Duncans created their signature roles in Topsy and Eva (Rosetta as the former, in blackface, Vivian as the latter), a musical comedy derived from the novel Uncle Tom's Cabin by Harriet Beecher Stowe.   For this production they wrote and introduced the songs "I Never Had a Mammy" and "Rememb'ring". A huge hit in its day, Topsy and Eva was subsequently adapted into a 1927 silent movie, directed by Del Lord with some additional scenes by D. W. Griffith.

It's a Great Life

In 1929 Metro-Goldwyn-Mayer released their early sound musical The Broadway Melody, starring Bessie Love and Anita Page as the fictional Mahoney sisters.  The film proved to be highly successful so MGM decided to follow it up with a similar film, this time starring the real-life Duncan Sisters in the leads.  The result was It's a Great Life (MGM, 1929), directed by Sam Wood and featuring three sequences filmed in Technicolor.  In the film the Duncan Sisters performed two of their most popular songs, "I'm Following You" and "Hoosier Hop."

Photoplay magazine stated in their review:

Unfortunately, the film "faltered at the box office and helped to cut short the Duncans' movie career." The movie, seldom seen for decades in part due to the color footage being missing, resurfaced in 2010 in a restored print released by Warner Bros. Archive.

MGM did cast the Duncans in their all-star 1930 extravaganza The March of Time, but that film was never completed.  In 1935 the Duncans returned to the screen in the short musical Surprise! which featured footage of them reprising their Topsy and Eva characters.

Later years

In 1930 Vivian married actor Nils Asther, who had co-starred with her and Rosetta in the film version of Topsy and Eva.  Rosetta (who was lesbian) attempted a solo career for a few years, but was rejoined with Vivian in 1932 after Vivian's divorce from Asther.

Although by now past their prime, the Duncan Sisters continued as a popular night club entertainers act for several more decades.  They also appeared in several soundies and also on television's You Asked For It. In the late 1940s the Duncans wrote and recorded four Christmas selections for the Hollywood Recording Guild Inc.: "Dear Santy", "The Angel on the Top of the X-mas Tree", "Twimmin' de Cwis'mas Twee" and "Jolly Ole Fella".  These appeared on 7" extended play 78rpm kiddie records.

In 1956 both Rosetta and Vivian appeared on Liberace's television show. They sang some of their songs and did their Topsy and Eva routine.

Their act ended in 1959 when Rosetta died from injuries sustained in an automobile accident, where she apparently fell asleep at the wheel while returning from a performance engagement, in Cicero, Illinois.  Vivian, who by that time had remarried to Frank Herman, subsequently continued performing as a single act on the club circuit. She died of Alzheimer's disease in 1986.

Unrealized movie project
In 1946, Twentieth Century-Fox considered making a musical biography about the sisters' life after the success of a film of another sister act, The Dolly Sisters. The project never got beyond the idea stage.

In 1952, Paramount Pictures announced plans for a biopic on the Duncans to star Betty Hutton and Ginger Rogers. Ms. Hutton demanded a rewrite after reading the first script draft and soon afterward walked out of her contract with the studio. Production plans for the film were then abandoned and never resumed.

Broadway appearances

Screen appearances

Selected recordings

See also

Blanche Merrill

References

External links

An article on Topsy and Eva
 Duncan Sisters (Vocal group) on Discography of American Historical Recordings

American women comedians
American comedy duos
Vaudeville performers
Sibling duos
Sibling musical duos
American musical duos
Burials at Forest Lawn Memorial Park (Glendale)
20th-century American musicians
20th-century American comedians
20th-century American women musicians